Sampath Kumar Kuttymani (born 28 September 1986) is an Indian professional footballer who plays as a midfielder for Kenkre in the I-League 2nd Division.

Career

Early career
Born in Bangalore, Karnataka, Kuttymani started his professional career with HAL SC in the National Football League. He then went on to play for Mumbai F.C. twice and Pune F.C. in between.

Bengaluru FC
In July 2013 it was confirmed that Kuttymani had signed with new direct-entry I-League side Bengaluru FC for the 2013–14 season.

Mumbai
In December 2014, Sampath signed for Mumbai F.C.

International
Kuttymani has represented India three times from 2006 to 2008.

Honours

India
SAFF Championship runner-up: 2008

References

External links 
 

1986 births
Living people
Footballers from Bangalore
Indian footballers
Hindustan Aeronautics Limited S.C. players
Mumbai FC players
Pune FC players
Bengaluru FC players
Association football midfielders
I-League players
I-League 2nd Division players
India international footballers
Fransa-Pax FC players
DSK Shivajians FC players